The National Interest Party (NIP) is a political parties in Nigeria. It was formed in 2017 by a group of young Nigerians led by Eunice Atuejide, NIP's founder and first National Chairman. NIP is designed to function predominantly online, therefore it is safe to refer to NIP as the world's first virtual political party.
NIP adopts the centrist progressive ideology i.e. neither leftist nor rightist. The party balances social conservative values with economic liberalism, thereby striking a balance between liberal ideology supporting social justice and enhanced government regulations, and a conservative ideology supporting pro-business and pro-growth reforms.
The party aims to attract exceptional talents of Nigerian descent to vie for elective roles in the polity. NIP is designed to appeal to Nigerians who are willing to work for the betterment of all Nigerians. People who are united irrespective of ethnic origins, religions, creeds, languages, tribes etc. People who will help the party build an all-inclusive Nigeria with the sincerity of purpose that has eluded the country since inception.

The Structure of NIP
Membership of NIP is open to every Nigerian over the age of 18 irrespective of physical location. This allows for Nigerians outside Nigeria to directly take part in shaping the direction of the party, as well as influencing the outcome of primary elections which produce the aspirants for general elections. In effect, Nigerians in the diaspora have the same level of influence as Nigerians within the shores of Nigeria in deciding the affairs of the party, and in the selection of aspirants to vie for office at general elections on the party's platform. 
In effect, Nigerians in the diaspora may take part in primary elections at NIP, and emerge NIP's final aspirants for participation in general elections in Nigeria from wherever in the world they reside. Nigerians in the diaspora may contest and win NIP's primaries without first making a trip to Nigeria, as they can reach and campaign to all party members via the party's website. All NIP elections are held online.

Party Executives
NIP strictly admits only men and women with undisputed integrity at the helm of its affairs. The party does not have a large number of executive roles because being a predominantly online platform, the party can function smoothly with fewer executives than most political parties. The party also has fewer than normal physical offices, however, it has many contact and support centres with local schools, business owners, places of worship etc. for the purpose of helping party members navigating the online platform.

Apart from the Board of Trustees and the Patrons who are selected and/or elected in accordance with the party's constitutional provisions, all other positions above are open for free and fair contests via NIP's website.
All party members over the age of 21 may contest any of the above positions provided they meet the party's additional constitutional requirements to contest the positions they wish to fill. All members who wish to contest at NIP must first however first submit themselves to NIP's Screening Committee for a thorough background check.
All aspirants are checked against the constitutional requirements for holding public office in Nigeria before they are permitted to vie for any office under the platform. Once successfully screened, aspirants are automatically admitted to the Leadership Cadre of the party which comprises all the men and women deemed fit to hold public office and control the affairs of the party.
NIP is more interested in selecting honest Nigerians who identify with its ideologies and strategy for bringing about a progressing Nigeria than it is in admitting more popular politicians, the educated or the wealthy class.

NIP's Leadership Cadre

Every Nigerian over the age of 18 can join NIP, however, only Nigerians 21 or over, who distinguish themselves may join the Leadership Cadre of NIP. Only those who cross into this cadre may run for office within the party, run on the party's platform to seek political office in Nigeria, and/or get nominated or appointed to hold public office in Nigeria through the party.
In effect, members who wish to work as Ward Representatives at extremely remote villages, just like those who wish to contest national elections or even the Presidency must first get past the Screening Committee to cross into the Leadership Cadre to do so. A token is paid by each applicant for the screening, however, candidates who cannot raise the required amount may use the points they accumulated from referring people to join NIP to pay their screening fees. This allows indigent but decent members of the party the opportunity to become executives of the party and/or vie for public office on the party's platform notwithstanding the requirement to pay for their screening.
Every member who meets the requirements to join the Leadership Cadre is encouraged to submit to the screening process because membership of the cadre allows them active and passive control of the party. It is from this group that members will be selected to represent the party were called upon to send forth party representatives. Leadership Cadre members will also have the opportunity to design programs for party members which may be implemented online and/or on ground e.g. lectures, webinars, seminars, symposiums etc. 
The cadre will consist only of Nigerians from every corner of the country who have been thoroughly checked for criminal history and behaviour, dishonest use of private and public funds, embezzlement or fraud, bankruptcies, involvement with terrorist organisations, secessionist groups, secret cults, community development initiatives etc. and found to have led exemplary lives. Those are the only members of NIP who may lead the party, run for office on the party's platform, and through appointive roles, lead the country.
Once successfully screened and admitted, leadership members are free to compete with other interested aspirants for whatever roles they wish to contest. It takes a click to join races candidates qualify for, however, they are restricted to run for one office at a time. Restrictions imposed by the party's constitution and the constitution of the Federal Republic of Nigeria also apply.
NIP's nomination forms are free and the party does not charge membership subscription fees. It relies on the voluntary donations of members to run its affairs.

Political Views
NIP's primary position is to bring to Nigeria a leadership founded on transparency and accountability in the conduct of all political activities. NIP proposes to bring a forward-looking and inspiring leadership to Nigeria. A leadership with a sense of mission. A leadership which only puts forward the honest, not the dishonest; the disciplined, not the erratic; the selfless, not the selfish; the qualified to lead, not the underqualified etc. NIP has set the bar very high, and will not negotiate to lower this standard.

NIP is committed to fighting mismanagement of national wealth, recovery of misappropriated resources, eradicate the abysmal levels of corruption in Nigeria, and end unequal treatment of people based on class, ethnic group, sex, religion or any other form of discrimination whatsoever. This is achievable in the near future because NIP is a group of like-minded Nigerians of all ages, backgrounds, religions, ethnicities, creeds, tribes, educational and professional qualification. All the differences as a people are well represented in the party and in its leadership. 
Clearly, NIP is the first formidable, national, broad-based, people-oriented and principled political party not affiliated with corrupt current or past political leaders in Nigeria with the common purpose to work relentlessly for the restoration of true democracy and good governance in Nigeria.

References

External links
 National Interest Party website
 Independent National Electoral Commission of Nigeria

National interest party
2017 establishments in Nigeria
Political parties established in 2017
Political parties in Nigeria